"Promise Me You'll Call" is a song by Australian rock musician, Jimmy Barnes. Released in November 1984 as the second single from his debut studio album, Bodyswerve. The song peaked at number 86 on the Australian Kent Music Report.

Track listing
7" Single (K 9538)
Side A "Promise Me You'll Call" 
Side B "Boys Cry Out For War"

Charts

References

Mushroom Records singles
1984 singles
1984 songs
Jimmy Barnes songs
Songs written by Jimmy Barnes
Song recordings produced by Mark Opitz